The list of ship launches in 1709 includes a chronological list of some ships launched in 1709.


References

1709
Ship launches